Csilla Balázs (born 23 July 1996), misspelled as Csilla Balasz, is a Hungarian–Romanian footballer who plays as a defender for Diósgyőri VTK and the Romania women's national team.

References

1996 births
Living people
Women's association football defenders
Romanian women's footballers
Romania women's international footballers
Romanian sportspeople of Hungarian descent
Place of birth missing (living people)
Hungarian women's footballers
Diósgyőri VTK players